Daubitz is a village and district of the municipality of Rietschen in the Saxon district of Görlitz. It is part of the Sorbian-inhabited region of Lusatia.

History

The oldest known mention of the village comes from 1346. In 1398 it was mentioned under its Sorbian name Ducz. It was established in the Middle Ages as a Sorbian village.

During World War II, the Germans operated a forced labor subcamp of the Stalag VIII-A prisoner-of-war camp in the village.

Demographics

References

Former municipalities in Saxony
Populated places in Görlitz (district)